The Fort Morgan Cut-Off of the Overland Stage Company (formerly the Central Overland, California, and Pike's Peak Express Company) passed through Adams County, Colorado. It was established in September 1862 as an offshoot of the Overland Trail.  The established stage route traveled through the present day towns of Greeley and Laporte in northern Colorado.  A connecting trail known as the Denver Road followed the South Platte River to  Denver and the surrounding mining towns.  The Fort Morgan Cut-off bypassed the stations between Fort Morgan, Colorado and Laporte and went directly to Denver.

Stations
Bijou Stage Station
Living Springs Stage Station
Kiowa Stage Station (now Bennett, Colorado)
Box Elder Stage Station (now Watkins, Colorado)
Coal Creek Stage Station (located in present-day Aurora, Colorado)
Toll Gate Stage Station (located in present-day Aurora, Colorado)

Sources
Wagner, Albin. "Overland Stage First Mass Transit System". Adams County Crossroads of the West 2:18-19 Denver Colorado: Century Graphics (1977).  (accessed September 4, 2006)

Transportation in Adams County, Colorado
History of Colorado
1862 establishments in Colorado Territory